William John Tilley (born 29 March 1963) is the Liberal Party member for the seat of Benambra in the Victorian Legislative Assembly. He was elected at the 2006 Victorian state election, beating Labor candidate and Wodonga mayor Lisa Mahood and former Nationals Upper House member Bill Baxter.

Prior to his candidacy, Tilley served in the Australian Army and then the Victoria Police.

Parliamentary career
Following the election of the Baillieu government at the 2010 Victorian state election, Tilley was appointed to be Parliamentary Secretary for Police. On 26 October 2011, the Office of Police Integrity released a report into the resignation of Assistant Police Commissioner Sir Ken Jones stating that Tilley had met with Sir Ken and Tristan Weston, a police officer on leave while acting as an advisor to the Police Minister Peter Ryan, to complain about the then Police Commissioner Simon Overland. As a result of the report, Tilley resigned as Parliamentary Secretary for Police.

References

External links
 Parliamentary voting record of Bill Tilley at Victorian Parliament Tracker

1963 births
Living people
Members of the Victorian Legislative Assembly
Liberal Party of Australia members of the Parliament of Victoria
Australian police officers
Australian Army officers
Politicians from Sydney
21st-century Australian politicians